Torbenia stempfferi is a butterfly in the family Lycaenidae. It is found in Cameroon, the Republic of the Congo and the Democratic Republic of the Congo.

Subspecies
Torbenia stempfferi stempfferi (Cameroon)
Torbenia stempfferi littoralis Collins & Larsen, 2000 (Cameroon)
Torbenia stempfferi cuypersi Libert, 2005 (Cameroon, Congo, Democratic Republic of the Congo)

References

Butterflies described in 2000
Poritiinae